Oprah: Where Are They Now? is an American reality television series on the Oprah Winfrey Network. The series debuted on October 2, 2012, and takes a look back at what happened to some of the biggest headline makers on The Oprah Winfrey Show plus updates on their current life.

On January 5, 2013, The Oprah Winfrey Network released its 2013 programming and announced that the series has been renewed for a second season. Season two premiered on Tuesday March 19, 2013 and features episodes that bring viewers updates on the following Oprah Show guests: Omarosa, Bow Wow, "Octomom" Nadya Suleman, Dennis Rodman, Gennifer Flowers and Heidi Fleiss. The second half of the season debuted on July 28, 2013, and features: Favorite American Idol contestants, Fab Morvan from Milli Vanilli, Ted Haggard, Anna Nicole Smith's daughter Danielynn and Danielynn's father Larry Birkhead, Fabio Lanzoni, Donald Trump's ex-wife Marla Maples, Molly Ringwald, Erin Brockovich, Diff’rent Strokes actor Todd Bridges, The Partridge Family stars Danny Bonaduce and David Cassidy, The Brady Bunch stars Barry Williams, Christopher Knight, Susan Olsen, and Mike Lookinland.

Episodes

Season 1 (2012)

Season 2 (2013)

Season 3 (2014)

Season 4 (2014)

Season 5 (2014-15)

Season 6 (2015)

Season 7 (2015-16)

Season 8 (2016)

Season 9 (2017)

Awards and nominations

References

External links
 
 
 

2010s American reality television series
2012 American television series debuts
2017 American television series endings
English-language television shows
Oprah Winfrey Network original programming
Television series by Harpo Productions
Oprah Winfrey